The Mortimer War Memorial is a monument that commemorates the lives of soldiers from Stratfield Mortimer, Berkshire, England, who were killed in war.

History 

The memorial was unveiled on 9 October 1921.

References

Bibliography 
  

Military history of Berkshire
Monuments and memorials in Berkshire
World War I memorials in England
World War II memorials in the United Kingdom
1921 establishments in England
Outdoor sculptures in England